Donovan Danhausen (born August 17, 1990), better known mononymously as Danhausen, is an American professional wrestler currently signed to All Elite Wrestling (AEW). He was previously known for his tenures with Ring of Honor (ROH) and Full Impact Pro (FIP) under the same name.

Early life
Donovan Danhausen was born in Detroit on August 17, 1990.

Professional wrestling career

Independent circuit (2013–present)
Danhausen was trained by Jimmy Jacobs and Truth Martini. He made his debut on October 18, 2013, becoming known for sticking to a gimmick illustrated by his spooky attire and painted face. He competed at BLP Slamilton 2, an event produced by Black Label Pro Wrestling, where he teamed up with Ethan Page and Swoggle to defeat Blood Diamond (Jake Lander, Joshua Bishop and Tre Lamar) for the BLP Tag Team Championship. He competed for Capital City Championship Combat at C4 Combat Shock - 12th Anniversary on November 21, 2019, where he defeated Tony Deppen.

At FU/Freelance I Don't Think We're In Chicago Anymore from October 10, 2020, an event produced by Freelance Underground Wrestling, Danhausen teamed up with Warhorse as Warhausen, defeating The Brothers Of Funstruction (Ruffo The Clown and Yabo The Clown) by disqualification, therefore failing to capture the FU Tag Team Championship. At F1RST Wrestling Saturday Night Nitro, an event produced by F1RST Wrestling on March 7, 2020, Danhausen fought Orange Cassidy into a no-contest.

Ring of Honor (2019–2021)
Danhausen made his first appearance for Ring Of Honor at ROH Wrestling #429 on November 2, 2019, where he unsuccessfully challenged Shane Taylor for the ROH World Television Championship. He continued to make sporadic appearances such as at ROH Wrestling #437 where he fell short to Rhett Titus on January 11, 2020, and at ROH Honor Reigns Supreme 2020 on January 12, where he scored a defeat against Dak Draper. At ROH Free Enterprise on February 9, 2020, Danhausen participated in a 20-man battle royal to determine the no.1 contendership for the ROH World Championship, where he competed against the winner Flip Gordon, Gangrel, PJ Black, Tracy Williams and others. At ROH Final Battle 2020 on December 18, he defeated Brian Johnson by disqualification, earning him an ROH contract (behind the scenes, Danhausen credits Alex Shelley with convincing ROH brass to sign him). At ROH 19th Anniversary Show on March 26, 2021, Danhausen competed in a four-way match, falling short to the winner, Brian Johnson, Eli Isom and LSG.

All Elite Wrestling (2022–present)
Danhausen made his All Elite Wrestling (AEW) debut during a special episode of Dynamite called Beach Break on January 26, 2022. He appeared during the Lights Out match between Orange Cassidy and Adam Cole. Hours later, AEW President Tony Khan announced that Danhausen had signed with the company. He began having interactions with Hook, wherein Hook is proving to be immune to Danhausen's curses, and Danhausen doing little more than occasionally annoy Hook with often humorous results. On the May 6, 2022 episode of Rampage, Hook declined Danhausen's offer to align with him, and Mark Sterling convinced Tony Nese to challenge Danhausen to a match on the next episode of Dynamite. On the May 11, 2022 episode of Dynamite, Danhausen wrestled in his first ever AEW match, losing to Nese following a distraction from Sterling. After the match, Hook would align with Danhausen after saving him from a beatdown from Nese and Sterling. The new tag team would make their debut on May 29 at the Double or Nothing Buy-In, defeating Nese and Sterling.
Since then, Danhausen has allied himself with Orange Cassidy and the Best Friends.

Professional wrestling style and persona
Danhausen has described his character as "Conan O'Brien possessed by a demon". In April 2021, he appeared as a guest on O'Brien's podcast Conan O'Brien Needs a Friend to discuss this concept. The character wears horror-themed face paint and believes he has supernatural powers, such as shooting lightning from his fingers and the ability to put curses on his enemies. The voice for his character is based on O'Brien and Mark Hamill's Joker. He often refers to himself in the third person, adds the suffix "-hausen" to words, Is interested and motivated by money and power, chastises other wrestlers if they use profanity, and describes himself and things he likes as "very nice, very evil". He is also known for nonchalantly dancing a "Pee-wee Herman dance" to the song "Tequila" in the middle of matches.

Other ventures
In collaboration with the Rootless Coffee Company, Danhausen launched a signature coffee blend called Danhausen Coffeehausen in 2021. Like many wrestlers, Danhausen has trademarked his ring name and catchphrases ("Love that Danhausen" and "Very Nice Very Evil"). In addition, he has trademarked the design of his face paint. The attorney who represented him in this matter, Michael Dockins (who works in conjunction with wrestlers so often he is nicknamed the "Gimmick Lawyer"), believes this to be the first time a wrestler has trademarked his physical appearance.

Personal life
Danhausen married Canadian burlesque dancer Lauren Jiles, known professionally as Lou Lou la Duchesse de Rière, in 2018. He is the stepfather of her daughter.

Championships and accomplishments
All Elite Wrestling
2023 Casino Tag Team Royale (with Orange Cassidy)
Black Label Pro
BLP Tag Team Championship (1 time) – with Ethan Page and Swoggle
Full Impact Pro
FIP Florida Heritage Championship (1 time)
Metro Wrestling Alliance
MWA Michigan Championship (1 time)
 Pro Wrestling Illustrated
 Ranked No. 158 of the top 500 singles wrestlers in the PWI 500 in 2020
 Ranked No. 171 of the top 500 singles wrestlers in the PWI 500 in 2021
Ring of Honor
ROH Year-End Award (1 time)
Best New Star

References

External links

 
 
 

1990 births
21st-century professional wrestlers
All Elite Wrestling personnel
American male professional wrestlers
American YouTubers
Living people
Professional wrestlers from Michigan
Sportspeople from Detroit